Matthews State Forest is a Virginia state forest located in Grayson County, near the City of Galax.  It is used for research into the American chestnut, as well as for demonstration of forestry management techniques; it serves as watershed protection and as a wildlife sanctuary, and has facilities for hiking.  Hunting is permitted on its .

References

Virginia state forests
Protected areas of Grayson County, Virginia